David Weir may refer to:
 David Weir (academic) (born 1947), American literature scholar
 David Weir (journalist), American journalist
 David Weir (Scottish footballer) (born 1970), Scottish footballer and football manager
 Davie Weir (footballer) (1863–1933), English footballer
 David Weir (politician) (1881–1929), Australian politician
 David Weir (writer) (1934–2011), British TV and film script writer
 David Weir (athlete) (born 1979), British Paralympic wheelchair athlete